The Aeromarine AS was a seaplane fighter aircraft evaluated by the US Navy in the early 1920s.

Development and design
Other than the vertical stabilizer, it was configured as a conventional two-bay biplane on twin pontoons, with two seats. The sole example of the original design, designated AS-1 had an inverted fin. After evaluation testing, the Navy ordered two aircraft, designated AS-2. The AS-2 had cruciform tails and larger radiators, and ailerons on both upper and lower wings.

Variants
A.S.-1 1 built
A.S.-2 2 built

Specifications (AS-1)

References

Citations

Bibliography
 
 Taylor, J. H. (ed) (1989) Jane's Encyclopedia of Aviation. Studio Editions: London. p. 29

External links

Single-engined tractor aircraft
Biplanes
1920s United States fighter aircraft
Floatplanes
AS